European Parliament election, 1996 may refer to:
1996 European Parliament election in Austria
1996 European Parliament election in Finland